Futbolo Klubas Vilnius or FK Vilnius is a Lithuanian football club based in Vilnius. It plays its home matches at the Fabijoniškių gimnazijos Stadium.

History
FK Vilnius club as an entity was founded in January 2019. The club created a venture with Baltijos Futbolo Akademija (BFA), which had been participating in I Lyga. BFA successfully went through the licensing process in order to acquire the 2019 I Lyga license. After BFA was granted the license, it requested name change to FK Vilnius. FK Vilnius are playing in I Lyga under BFA licence.

At the beginning of the 2020 LFF I Lyga season Baltijos Futbolo Akademija and FK Vilnius have split up. BFA licensed to I Lyga, whilst FK Vilnius intends to participate in II Lyga. The club owners remain ambitious, a youth football academy "Vilnius Kickers" was established.

Name change history 
 Until 2019: Baltijos Futbolo Akademija (BFA)
 2019–present: FK Vilnius

Club colours 
 Home: red and black  
 Away: blue 

 Kit manufacturers
 Nike (from 2019)

Current squad 
As of 27 January 2020.

|-----
! colspan="9" bgcolor="#B0D3FB" align="left" |
|----- bgcolor="#DFEDFD"

|-----
! colspan="9" bgcolor="#B0D3FB" align="left" |
|----- bgcolor="#DFEDFD"

|-----
! colspan="9" bgcolor="#B0D3FB" align="left" |
|----- bgcolor="#DFEDFD"

References

External links 
 Official club website
 Facebook FK Vilnius
 FK Vilnius in I Lyga Website

Football clubs in Lithuania
Football clubs in Vilnius
Sport in Vilnius
2019 establishments in Lithuania
Association football clubs established in 2019